The Teatro Romano or Roman Theater are the ruins of a 1st-century ancient Roman theater of the former town of Iguvium (now Gubbio); the located in a grassy park just south of the highway SR298 as it passes the center of the historic town in the region of Umbria, Italy.

The ruins consist of limestone arcades, which originally formed a two-story hemicircle with 27 arches. The lower arcade had a vomitorium with roofed corridor. The theater originally had an orchestra pit separated from the proscenium by a tall podium. The theater was expected to sit nearly 6000 persons. The present layout derives from restoration efforts in the past two centuries. A nearby museum (antiquarium) displays archeologic finds from Gubbio. In the summer, the theater is used for some outdoor performances.

References

Gubbio
Buildings and structures completed in the 1st century
Buildings and structures in Gubbio
Gubbio